Charles Osa Igbinovia (born 20 November 1971), commonly known as Charles Novia, is a Nigerian film director, producer, screenwriter, actor, social commentator and essayist. Born and raised in Benin City, the capital of Edo State, Novia is known for films such as Missing Angel (2004), Caught in The Middle and Alan Poza (2013). In 2014, he was chosen as part of the Nigerian team to screen Nollywood films for Best Foreign language category of the Academy Awards by the Academy of Motion Picture Arts and Sciences.

Filmography
Alan Poza
Missing Angel
Caught in the Middle
The Pastor and Harlot
The Bridesmaid

See also
 List of Nigerian film producers

References

External links
Official Website

1971 births
Nigerian male film actors
Living people
Nigerian film directors
Nigerian film producers
People from Benin City
Male actors from Edo State
Nigerian screenwriters
University of Nigeria alumni
Nigerian essayists